Joshua Prager may refer to:

 Joshua Prager (writer) (born 1971), former writer for the Wall Street Journal and author of The Echoing Green
 Joshua Prager (doctor) (born 1949), neurophysician